John Duffield Curtis (born March 9, 1948), is an American former professional baseball pitcher. Twice a first-round draft pick, Curtis played baseball at Clemson University and then pitched for several Major League Baseball (MLB) teams between 1970 and 1984. He retired with an 89–97 win–loss record and a 3.96 earned run average (ERA).

Early life
Curtis attended Smithtown High School in Smithtown, New York. He was originally drafted by the Cleveland Indians in the first round of the 1966 Major League Baseball draft but did not sign, choosing instead to attend Clemson University. In 1967, he played collegiate summer baseball with the Chatham A's of the Cape Cod Baseball League.

Career

Boston Red Sox
After two seasons at Clemson, he was drafted by the Boston Red Sox in the first round of the secondary phase of the 1968 Major League Baseball draft, and signed with the club.

Curtis was called to the majors during his third minor league season, and made his major league debut as a reliever on August 13,  against the Kansas City Royals. After getting through his first two innings with just one hit and one walk, he loaded the bases, and gave up a grand slam to Ed Kirkpatrick in his third inning of work. He did not pitch in the majors again for over a year.

When he returned to the BoSox in September , he was used as a starter by manager Eddie Kasko. After losing his first two starts against the New York Yankees and Detroit Tigers, he got his first major league win out of the bullpen against the Cleveland Indians. He then pitched a complete game victory over the Washington Senators in his final game of the season.

Curtis began the  season with the triple A Louisville Colonels, but he was back with the Red Sox by the end of May. He was traded after the  season with Mike Garman and Lynn McGlothen to the St. Louis Cardinals for Reggie Cleveland, Terry Hughes and Diego Seguí.

With the new designated hitter rule to go into effect the following season, Curtis became the last pitcher to ever bat at Fenway Park on September 28, 1972, in the bottom of the seventh inning in a 3-1 Red Sox win against the Kansas City Royals.

St. Louis Cardinals
The Cards were battling the Pittsburgh Pirates for first place in the National League East all season when the Bucs came to Busch Stadium for a three-game set September 23–25, . The Pirates took two of the three with Curtis taking the loss in the second game. Curtis spent three seasons in St. Louis, going 24–34 with a 3.88 earned run average and 208 strikeouts, mostly as a starter.

San Francisco Giants
After the  season, he was traded to the San Francisco Giants with Willie Crawford and Vic Harris for Mike Caldwell, John D'Acquisto and Dave Rader. Curtis became predominantly a reliever for the first time in his career while with the Giants. He went 17–15 with a 4.45 ERA over three seasons with the Giants, appearing in 116 games.

Curtis played for the San Francisco Giants from 1977 to 1979. In his first start for the Giants on May 8, 1977, Curtis pitched a two-hit 10–0 shutout versus the Mets and hit for two singles and a triple. While playing for the Giants, Curtis lived in Foster City, California.

San Diego Padres
He was converted back to a starter when he signed with the San Diego Padres as a free agent for the  season, and emerged as the ace of the staff by the end of the season, going 10–8 with a 3.51 ERA for the last-place team. He began the strike-shortened  season as a starter, but after going 0–2 with a 6.30 ERA in that role, he was converted to a reliever, and pitched exclusively in that role during the second half of the season when play resumed.

California Angels
Curtis' contract was purchased by the California Angels on August 31, during their playoff drive. Though he joined his new club in time to be on the postseason roster, he did not see any playing time during the 1982 American League Championship Series. He remained with the Angels through , then retired.

Personal life
Curtis lives in Long Beach, California, with his wife, Mary Ann. Upon retiring, Curtis began freelance writing articles for the San Diego Union-Tribune, Boston Globe, San Francisco Chronicle and Sports Illustrated. After a nearly twenty-year absence from the game, he returned to coach the Long Beach Breakers during the two-year run of the independent Western Baseball League ( and ).

Curtis was inducted into the Suffolk Sports Hall of Fame on Long Island in the Baseball Category with the Class of 1992.

Career statistics

References

External links

John Curtis at Baseball Almanac

1948 births
Living people
American expatriate baseball players in Canada
Baseball players at the 1967 Pan American Games
Baseball players from Massachusetts
Boston Red Sox players
California Angels players
Clemson Tigers baseball players
Chatham Anglers players
Edmonton Trappers players
Greenville Red Sox players
Louisville Colonels (minor league) players
Major League Baseball pitchers
Pan American Games gold medalists for the United States
Pan American Games medalists in baseball
Pawtucket Red Sox players
San Diego Padres players
San Francisco Giants players
Baseball players from Long Beach, California
Sportspeople from Newton, Massachusetts
Sportspeople from Smithtown, New York
St. Louis Cardinals players
Winston-Salem Red Sox players
Medalists at the 1967 Pan American Games